Kyle Thomas Copp (born 1 November 1996) is a Welsh semi-professional footballer who plays as a midfielder.

Club career
Following his release from Swansea City, Copp signed for Football League Two side Yeovil Town on non-contract terms. He made his professional debut on 30 August 2016 as a substitute in Yeovil's 4–3 victory over Portsmouth, in the EFL Trophy.

On 30 December 2016, Copp signed for Southern League Premier Division side Merthyr Town. He moved to Spanish club CD Almuñecar City in January 2018.

In December 2018, Copp joined Tercera División side Atarfe Industrial.

In September 2020, Copp signed for Redditch United in the Southern Premier Division and made his debut as a substitute in an away win over Banbury United. In January 2021, he returned to Llanelli Town.

International career
He has played for the Wales under-17 team.

Career statistics

References

1996 births
Living people
Welsh footballers
Swansea City A.F.C. players
Yeovil Town F.C. players
Merthyr Town F.C. players
Llanelli Town A.F.C. players
Redditch United F.C. players
Association football midfielders
Wales youth international footballers
Welsh expatriate footballers
Welsh expatriate sportspeople in Spain
Expatriate footballers in Spain
Tercera División players
Atarfe Industrial CF players